Manish Singh Rawat (born 5 May 1991) is a male Indian racewalker. He competes in the 20 km and the 50 km events and is employed by the Uttarakhand State Police. He has been part of the Indian racewalking squad for the past 3 years.

He competed in the 50 kilometres walk event at the 2015 World Championships in Athletics in Beijing, China. Manish Singh also completed his 20 km race in 1 hour 20 minutes and 50 seconds at the IAAF Race Walking challenge in April 2015.

He is a landless agriculture labourer from Uttarakhand who has also worked as a waiter for a living.

He is currently being supported by the GoSports Foundation through the Rahul Dravid Athlete Mentorship Programme.

Career 

Born in a family of modest means, Manish walked 7 km each way to school. He secured his berth for the Rio Olympics after making the qualification mark, clocking 1:22:50, at the IAAF Racewalking Challenge, finishing 9th.

At the Rio Olympics, Manish finished a commendable 13th in the 20 km race walking category ahead of higher ranked opponents.

Achievements 
New Delhi Indian Race Walking championships 

Gold Coast Commonwealth Games 

Rio de Janeiro Olympic Games

See also
 India at the 2015 World Championships in Athletics

References

External links

1991 births
Living people
Indian male racewalkers
World Athletics Championships athletes for India
Athletes (track and field) at the 2016 Summer Olympics
Athletes (track and field) at the 2018 Commonwealth Games
Athletes (track and field) at the 2018 Asian Games
Olympic athletes of India
People from Chamoli district
Athletes from Uttarakhand
Asian Games competitors for India
Commonwealth Games competitors for India